Hamidou M'Baye (born 21 April 1964) is a Senegalese hurdler. He competed in the 400 metres hurdles at the 1988 Summer Olympics and the 1996 Summer Olympics.

References

1964 births
Living people
Athletes (track and field) at the 1988 Summer Olympics
Athletes (track and field) at the 1996 Summer Olympics
Senegalese male hurdlers
Olympic athletes of Senegal
Place of birth missing (living people)